Terence Ledgerton (7 October 1930 – December 2004) was an English football outside left who played in the Football League for Brentford and Millwall.

Playing career

Brentford 
Ledgerton began his career as a youth in his native Liverpool with spells at St. Dominic's and Huyton. He also represented a Liverpool FA Youth XI. Ledgerton moved on to join the youth team at Second Division club Brentford as an amateur in 1949. He made his debut in a 0–0 draw with West London rivals Queens Park Rangers on 9 February 1952. He established himself as a first team regular during the 1952–53 season and made 31 appearances. Ledgerton's appearances tailed off during the 1953–54 season and he departed the club in May 1954.

Millwall 
Ledgerton joined Third Division South club Millwall in May 1954, in an exchange deal for George Stobbart. He made just 6 appearances for the club, scoring twice, before departing at the end of the 1954–55 season.

Clacton Town 
Ledgerton dropped into non-league football and joined Eastern Counties League club Clacton Town in the summer of 1955. He bagged 30 goals during the 1955–56 season to set a new goalscoring record at the club and beat his own record by scoring 31 goals in the 1956–57 season, winning the East Anglian Cup. Ledgerton was an integral part of the best years in the club's existence, firing in the goals which led the club to be accepted into the Southern League South-East Division, its highest ever placing in the league pyramid. After suffering relegation at the 1958–59 season, the club won the 1959–60 Southern League First Division title. Ledgerton played for Clacton into the 1960s.

Personal life 
Ledgerton's grandson, Matt Waters, also became a footballer and is F.C. Clacton's all-time leading goalscorer.

Honours 
Clacton Town
 East Anglian Cup: 1956–57
 Southern Football League First Division: 1959–60

Career statistics

References

1930 births
2004 deaths
Footballers from Liverpool
English footballers
Brentford F.C. players
English Football League players
Millwall F.C. players
Association football forwards
Association football wingers
F.C. Clacton players
Southern Football League players